Carposina thermurga is a moth in the family Carposinidae. It was described by Edward Meyrick in 1929. It is found in South Africa.

References

Endemic moths of South Africa
Carposinidae
Moths described in 1929
Moths of Africa